Sean David Kenney (born March 13, 1944) is an American actor best known for his role in Star Trek as the physically disabled Fleet Captain Christopher Pike in "The Menagerie" (the healthy Pike was played by Jeffrey Hunter), and as Lieutenant DePaul in "Arena" and "A Taste of Armageddon."

After his roles on Star Trek and a few other small parts, including his first bit part in The Impossible Years (1968), Kenney had leading roles in several films including How's Your Love Life? (1971) and the cult horror film The Corpse Grinders (1971), and Slumber Party '57 (1976), which is his final film to date.

In 1980, Kenney became a professional photographer, mainly focusing on promotional photographic work.

Filmography
 The Impossible Years (1968) (uncredited)
 Machismo: 40 Graves for 40 Guns (1971) .... Wichita
 The Toy Box (1971) .... Ralph  (as Evan Steel)
 The Corpse Grinders (1971) .... Dr. Howard Glass
 How's Your Love Life? (1971) .... Steve Roberts
 Roadside Service (1973) (as Evan Steel)
 Cycle Psycho (1973).... Romeo
 Terminal Island (1973) .... Bobby
 Slumber Party '57 (1976) .... Cal

References

External links

 (includes biography)

1944 births
American male film actors
American photographers
American male television actors
20th-century American male actors
Living people
Male actors from Boston